Fuad Mohamed Qalaf (born 28 March 1965), also known as Fuad Shangole, is a Somali-Swedish militant Islamist. He was a senior leader of the now defunct Islamic Courts Union (ICU), and is currently a senior leader of its successor al-Shabaab.

Biography
Born in Mogadishu, Qalaf came to Sweden as an asylum seeker in 1992 and later received Swedish citizenship. He stayed in Sweden for twelve years, most of the time preaching as an Imam at mosque in the Rinkeby district in Stockholm (Swedish: Rinkebymoskén).  As such, he worked to influence young Muslims about Jihad. He was openly sympathetic towards al-Qaeda and collected money towards financing the Islamic Courts Union in Somalia as well as recruiting youth to both the Islamic Courts Union and later also to al-Shabaab. He was also a prolific lecturer at the Bellevue Mosque in Gothenburg. In 2004, Qalaf returned to Somalia together with his family to fight with the Islamic Courts Union in the war against the Transitional Federal Government and allied Ethiopian forces.

Following the conquest of Mogadishu in 2007, Qalaf went on to serve as head of the Department of Education under the new ICU-government. The Somali human rights group Sultan Hurre Human Rights Focus also described him as a "senior leader" of ICU militant youth wing al-Shabaab. After the Ethiopian invasion of Somalia in December 2006 and the subsequent fall of the ICU-government, Qalaf and other ICU leaders fled to Mecca in Saudi Arabia. In April 2007 he was reported as living in Kenya.

According to the Swedish news website Nyheter24, Qalaf participated in the March 2009 stoning of a thirteen-year-old Somali girl named Asho Duhalow. The girl was sentenced to death according to Islamic Sharia law because she reportedly didn't follow Islamic clothing laws. Later during the day, according to the same source, he also cut the hand of a Somali man who was accused of theft. The man had stolen money and clothes to the value of approximately US$100. In May 2014, Qalaf stated that al-Shabab fighters would carry out jihad, or holy war, in Kenya and Uganda "and afterward, with God's will, to America."

References 

1965 births
Al-Shabaab (militant group) members
Living people
People from Mogadishu
Somalian emigrants to Sweden
Swedish people of Somali descent
Swedish imams
Islamic terrorism in Sweden
Swedish Islamists
Muslims with branch missing
People of the Somali Civil War